Pseudomonas agarici is a Gram-negative soil bacterium that causes drippy gill in mushrooms (Agaricus bisporus). It was first isolated in New Zealand. P. agarici could not be grouped based on 16S rRNA analysis, so it is designated incertae sedis in the genus Pseudomonas.

References

External links
Type strain of Pseudomonas agarici at BacDive -  the Bacterial Diversity Metadatabase

Pseudomonadales
Bacteria described in 1970